The ISKA (originally International Sport Karate Association, later also called the International Sport Kickboxing Association) is one of the major international bodies regulating sport karate and kickboxing matches, and is based in the United States. It was established in 1985 as a response to legal and revenue issues that sent the Professional Karate Association (PKA) into decline.

History
From 1974 until 1985, the PKA had been the most recognized worldwide kickboxing sanctioning group.  It was instrumental in establishing public relay of the sport via ESPN, helping to introduce the burgeoning sport to a wider audience, and had also developed the first fighter's ratings systems. Five major U.S.-based promoters and resigning PKA executives created the new body, the International Sport Karate Association (ISKA), with an official announcement on July 16, 1986. The first U.S. directors were Mike Sawyer, Karyn Turner, Tony Thompson, John Worley and Scott Coker. It currently runs the biggest martial arts tournament in the world, The U.S Open. Thousands of competitors from around the world participate every year.

Many of the major PKA promoters began sanctioning their events with the ISKA and several also joined its administration. ISKA also secured ESPN broadcasts of its major title bouts in 1986, thus helping bring quick credibility and recognition to the new association.

Since the World Association of Kickboxing Organizations (WAKO) was mostly active in Europe and the World Kickboxing Association (WKA) in Asia, ISKA was quick to expand through its own European Directors starting October 1986 with Olivier Muller, Jérome Canabate and Mohamed Hosseini. American Richard Mayor oversaw the establishment of this European wing as European President between 1986 and 1988.

By 1991, the worldwide control of the ISKA was shared by two co-chairmen: Mike Sawyer and Olivier Muller. International TV coverage was secured, and united separate organizations were formed worldwide to handle responsibility for international sanctioning and grading.  ISKA has conducted its official activities under ISKA ASIA since 2008 with Dr. S. A. Moinshirazi the President of ISKA ASIA. Paul Zadro is the President of ISKA Australia, which is the biggest martial arts tournament circuit in Australia.

In the early 2000s ISKA began sanctioning K-1 events such as K1-MAX and K-1 USA, and for several years they also sanctioned both kickboxing and MMA events for Strikeforce. Starting from 2012, ISKA sanctioned events for the kickboxing promotion Glory.

Current activities
ISKA is a sport karate, all styles kickboxing, mixed martial arts (MMA) sanctioning body in the United States and over 50 countries worldwide.

ISKA's Martial Arts World Championships are held yearly at the US Open of Martial Arts in Disney World, Orlando, Florida. The US Open ISKA World Martial Arts Championships is held annually every year on the Fourth of July weekend. More than 8,000 competitors and 12,000 spectators attend the two-day event each year. The event closes with the Night of Champions featuring the ISKA World Martial Arts Championships. The Night of Champions airs live on ESPN3, while a highlights show airs later on ESPN2. The US Open is the longest continuously running martial arts event on ESPN. The US Open highlights continue to air throughout the year on CSI Sports networks, reaching approximately 85 million households.

Kickboxing World Champions

Men's Kickboxing Divisions

As of July 14, 2020

Women's Kickboxing Divisions

As of August 31, 2020

Sport Karate World Champions

Current ISKA Team World Champions

Current ISKA Adult World Champions

Current ISKA Youth World Champions 

As of July 3rd, 2021

Breaking World Champions

See also
 World Association of Kickboxing Organizations

References

External links
Web resources
International Sport Karate Association (I.S.K.A. Head Office)
International Sport Karate Association (I.S.K.A. ASIA)
International Sport Karate Association (I.S.K.A. EUROPE)
International Sport Kickboxing Association (I.S.K.A. CZECH REPUBLIC
Books and articles
 "A History of Full Contact Karate
 "A History of Kickboxing" – Mikes Miles
 "A History of kickboxing" – « black-belt »
 Delmas Alain, Callière Jean-Roger, Histoire du Kick-boxing, FKBDA, France, 1998
 Delmas Alain, Définition du Kick-boxing, FKBDA, France, 1999
Miles Mikes, site An interview with Joe Lewis, 1998

Sports organizations established in 1985
Kickboxing organizations
Karate organizations
1985 establishments in Florida